Atlantomyia is a genus of bristle flies in the family Tachinidae.

Specia
Atlantomyia nitida Crosskey, 1977

Distribution
Saint Helena.

References

Taxa named by Roger Ward Crosskey
Exoristinae
Diptera of Africa
Insects of Saint Helena Island
Insects described in 1977